The 1st Virginia State Regiment was a regiment of regular state troops from Virginia which fought during the American Revolutionary War.

Formation
The regiment was authorized by the General Assembly of the Commonwealth of Virginia in December 1776 as a force of regular troops for the Commonwealth's defense.

In the Contintenal Army
In 1777, Virginia had difficulty meeting its quota for the regular line of the Continental Army. As a result, in July 1777 under the command of Colonel George Gibson, the regiment began a march North to temporarily join the Continental Army in the Philadelphia Campaign. In January 1778, the Virginia General Assembly passed an act directing that the 1st Virginia State Regiment "now in Continental service, be continued in said service instead of the Ninth Virginia Regiment, made prisoners by the enemy in the Battle of Germantown." The regiment camped at Valley Forge in the winter of 1777-78 and at Middlebrook in the winter of 1778-79 and participated in the Battle of Monmouth. The regiment remained in the service of the Continental Army until late 1779 when redeployed Virginia.

Organization
Unlike the standard division of eight found in the regular line regiments of the Continental Army, the 1st Virginia State Regiment consisted of ten companies including one of light infantry.

Field Officers 

 Colonel George Gibson
 Lt. Colonel William Brent
 Lt. Colonel John Allison
 Major Thomas Meriweather

Company Commanders 
 Captain Thomas "Ol'Henry" Pollard
 Captain William Hoffler
 Captain Thomas Ewell
 Captain Windsor Brown
 Captain John Nicholas
 Captain John Holt (replaced Capt. Nicholas)
 Captain William Payne
 Captain Charles Ewell (replaced Capt. Payne)
 Captain John Lee
 Captain Thomas Armistead (replaced Capt. Lee)
 Captain Thomas Meriweather (promoted to Major)
 Captain John Shields (replaced Capt. Meriweather)
 Captain William Campbell (replaced Capt. Shields)
  Captain John Camp
 Captain Angus Rucker (replaced Capt. Camp)
 Captain Jacob Valentine (replaced Capt. Rucker)
 Captain Abner Crump
 Captain Thomas Hamilton
 Captain Robert Daniel Brown
 Captain Thomas Smith

References

External links 

 The Muster Roll Project The Friends of the Valley Forge Park

Military units of Virginia in the American Revolution